German Semyonovich Zonin (9 September 1926 – 26 November 2021) was a Soviet and Russian football coach and player.

He died on 26 November 2021, at the age of 95.

Honours
 1972 Soviet Top League champion with Zarya Voroshilovgrad.

References

External links
 

1926 births
2021 deaths
Footballers from Kazan
Soviet footballers
Soviet football managers
FC Fakel Voronezh managers
FC Zorya Luhansk managers
Soviet expatriate football managers
Expatriate football managers in Myanmar
Myanmar national football team managers
Soviet Union national football team managers
FC Zenit Saint Petersburg managers
FC SKA Rostov-on-Don managers
FC Dinamo Tbilisi managers
Russian football managers
Merited Coaches of the Soviet Union
Honoured Coaches of Russia
Association football defenders
FC Dynamo Saint Petersburg players
FC Dynamo Kazan players